Jaclyn Tsai or Tsai Yu-ling (born 22 August 1955) is a Taiwanese politician. She was the Minister without Portfolio of the Executive Yuan from November 2013-20 May 2016.

Career 
She promoted e-commerce related laws and industrial development, issuing draft Regulations on the Management of Electronic Payment Institutions that were adopted on May 3. The 15 authorization provisions were completed by the Financial Supervisory Commission on  May 3, 2015. 

Simultaneously, she held the positions of Convener, E-commerce Development Taskforce, Executive Yuan; Convener, Mobile Broadband Service and Industry Development Taskforce, Executive Yuan; Convener, Virtual World Law Adjustment Taskforce, Executive Yuan; Convener, vMaker Taskforce, Executive Yuan; Convener, Golden Pin Design Award Ceremony Organizing Committee; Convener, Chung Hsing New Village Innovation Zone Taskforce; Deputy Convener, Innovation and Startups Taskforce, Executive Yuan; Deputy Convener, National Information and Communications Initiative Committee, Executive Yuan; Member, Open Data Advisory Taskforce, Executive Yuan; Member, Board of Science and Technology, Executive Yuan.

She was a founder of Lee, Tsai and Partners (1998 – 2013), General Counsel of IBM Greater China Group  (1996 - 1998), General Counsel of IBM Taiwan (1991 - 1996), Judge of Taipei, Shih-Lin, Taoyuan and Chang hua District Courts (1982 - 1991).

MTAC Ministry
Tsai inaugurated the "Tibetan Cultural and Artistic Festival Activities" in May 2015 that elevated three running themes, including thangka painting exhibitions, public Buddhist prayer, Sanskrit music performances to showcase Tibetan culture and Taiwanese religious festivals. The activities were highlighted by the Tourism Bureau.

Personal life
Tsai and her husband possess assets worth NT$ 100 million in Mainland China. Tsai said that all of her assets are legally obtained and she has declared them to the Control Yuan.

See also
 Mongolian and Tibetan Affairs Commission
 Republic of China–Mongolia relations
 Mongolia
 Tibet Autonomous Region
 Executive Yuan

References

Living people
1955 births
Women government ministers of Taiwan
Government ministers of Taiwan
National Taiwan University alumni
21st-century Taiwanese women politicians
21st-century Taiwanese politicians
Taiwanese women judges
20th-century women judges